Burschville School, also known as District No. 107 School, is a one-room schoolhouse near Corcoran, Minnesota, United States. It was built in 1894 and listed on the National Register of Historic Places in 2018, complete with its original outhouses. It has been preserved as a museum embodying local efforts to provide education in rural Hennepin County.

References

External links
 Corcoran's Burschville School House

Buildings and structures in Hennepin County, Minnesota
National Register of Historic Places in Hennepin County, Minnesota
One-room schoolhouses in Minnesota
School buildings completed in 1894
School buildings on the National Register of Historic Places in Minnesota